Naubinway Island is an island in Lake Michigan. It is located in Garfield Township, in Mackinac County, Michigan. The island lies just over a half mile south of Michigan's Upper Peninsula mainland. The unincorporated community of Naubinway is north of the island.

Notes

Islands of Mackinac County, Michigan
Islands of Lake Michigan in Michigan